Igors Vihrovs (born 6 June 1978) is a Latvian gymnast, who won the gold medal in floor exercise at the 2000 Summer Olympics, and bronze in floor exercise in 2000 European Championships and 2001 World Championships. He was the first Olympic gold medalist for independent Latvia.

References

External links
 
 
 
 

1978 births
Living people
Sportspeople from Riga
Latvian male artistic gymnasts
Olympic gymnasts of Latvia
Gymnasts at the 2000 Summer Olympics
Gymnasts at the 2004 Summer Olympics
Olympic gold medalists for Latvia
Medalists at the World Artistic Gymnastics Championships
Olympic medalists in gymnastics
Medalists at the 2000 Summer Olympics
Universiade medalists in gymnastics
Universiade silver medalists for Latvia
Latvian people of Russian descent